The 2018 World RX of Canada was the seventh round of the fifth season of the FIA World Rallycross Championship. The event was held at the Circuit Trois-Rivières in Trois-Rivières, Quebec.

Supercar 

Source

Heats

Semi-finals 

 Semi-Final 1

 Semi-Final 2

Final

Standings after the event

 Note: Only the top five positions are included.

References 

|- style="text-align:center"
|width="35%"|Previous race:2018 World RX of Sweden
|width="40%"|FIA World Rallycross Championship2018 season
|width="35%"|Next race:2018 World RX of France
|- style="text-align:center"
|width="35%"|Previous race:2017 World RX of Canada
|width="40%"|World RX of Canada
|width="35%"|Next race:2019 World RX of Canada
|- style="text-align:center"

Canada
World RX
World RX